The 2022 ABN AMRO Rotterdam was a men's tennis tournament played on indoor hard courts. It took place at the Rotterdam Ahoy in the Dutch city of Rotterdam, between 7 and 13 February 2022. It was the 49th edition of the Rotterdam Open, and part of the ATP Tour 500 series on the 2022 ATP Tour. The tournament also includes a Men's Wheelchair Tennis Singles and Doubles draw.

Finals

Singles 

  Félix Auger-Aliassime def.  Stefanos Tsitsipas, 6–4, 6–2

Doubles 

  Robin Haase /  Matwé Middelkoop def.  Lloyd Harris /  Tim Pütz, 4–6, 7–6(7–5), [10–5]

Points and prize money

Point distribution

Prize money 

*per team

Singles main-draw entrants

Seeds 

 1 Rankings are as of 31 January 2022.

Other entrants 
The following players received wildcards into the main draw:
  Tallon Griekspoor
  Andy Murray
  Jo-Wilfried Tsonga

The following player received a special exempt into the main draw:
  Mikael Ymer

The following players received entry from the qualifying draw:
  Egor Gerasimov 
  Henri Laaksonen 
  Jiří Lehečka
  Bernabé Zapata Miralles

The following player received entry as a lucky loser:
  Hugo Gaston

Withdrawals
  Roberto Bautista Agut → replaced by  Kwon Soon-woo
  Arthur Rinderknech → replaced by  Hugo Gaston
  Borna Ćorić → replaced by  Alejandro Davidovich Fokina
  Daniil Medvedev → replaced by  Mackenzie McDonald
  Gaël Monfils → replaced by  Alexei Popyrin
  Jannik Sinner → replaced by  Botic van de Zandschulp

Doubles main-draw entrants

Seeds 

1 Rankings as of 31 January 2022.

Other entrants 
The following pairs received wildcards into the doubles main draw:
  Tallon Griekspoor /  Botic van de Zandschulp
  Robin Haase /  Matwé Middelkoop

The following pair received entry from the qualifying draw:
  Jesper de Jong /  Sem Verbeek

Withdrawals 
Before the tournament
  Tim Pütz /  Michael Venus → replaced by  Lloyd Harris /  Tim Pütz

References

External links 
 

ABN AMRO Rotterdam
ABN AMRO Rotterdam
Rotterdam Open
ABN Amro Rotterdam